Jaynagar railway station is a main terminal railway station in Madhubani district, Bihar. Its code is JYG. It serves Jainagar and the surrounding areas. The station consists of 5 platforms.

History 

The Jayanagar–Janakpur–Bijalpura line a  narrow-gauge railway was introduced during the Rana period. It is expected to be complete  by December 2019. This was Nepal's last surviving railway.
Now again the train starts in 2022 4th April

Sections
The Jaynagar railway station is splitting into two sections. One section is serving the Indian Railways while the new section has been built for the Nepal Railways. Daily two DEMU trains ply on the route.

Major trains  
  Darbhanga–Jaynagar Passenger
  Ganga Sagar Express
  Puri–Jaynagar Express
  Howrah–Jaynagar Passenger
  Janaki Intercity Express
  Jaynagar–Anand Vihar Garib Rath Express
  Jaynagar–Lokmanya Tilak Terminus Antyodaya Express
  Jaynagar–Patna Intercity Express
  Jaynagar–Rajendra Nagar Terminal Intercity Express
  Jaynagar–Ranchi Express
  Kamla Gaga Intercity Fast Passenger
  Kolkata–Jaynagar Weekly Express
  Samastipur–Jaynagar Passenger
  Samastipur–Jaynagar DEMU
  Saryu Yamuna Express
  Shaheed Express
  Jaynagar–Udhna Antyodaya Express
  Swatantra Senani Superfast Express

Nearest airport
The nearest airports are Darbhanga Airport at Darbhanga, Bagdogra Airport at Siliguri, Gaya Airport at Gaya, Lok Nayak Jayaprakash Airport at Patna and Netaji Subhash Chandra Bose International Airport at Calcutta.

See also

References

External links

 website

Railway stations in Madhubani district
Samastipur railway division
Transport in Jainagar